Streets of SimCity is a racing and vehicular combat 3D computer game published by Maxis and Electronic Arts in 1997. The game features the ability to visit any city created in SimCity 2000, as well as a network mode, allowing for players to play deathmatches with up to seven other players. It is the last Maxis game to be developed and released without supervision by Electronic Arts, which acquired Maxis in the two months leading up to release.

Audio
The soundtrack of the game was composed by Jerry Martin, known for composing music for The Sims and the SimCity series. The game includes several styles of music, represented via the radio stations. The stations include jazz, techno, bluegrass, and rock. Some of the music lived on and was included in The Sims, as music for "action television programs", as well as tracks on radio and audio systems..

Reception

The game received unfavorable reviews from critics. Next Generation said, "When all is said and done, Streets of Sim City is better left on the store shelves. With its surprisingly high system requirements (P166 and 32 MB of RAM at a minimum), the game already has a limited audience by necessity. [...] Pass on this one and dig out Interstate '76 instead – same idea, much more fun."

References

External links

SimStreetsX - A Windows 64-bit compability patch

1997 video games
Electronic Arts games
Maxis Sim games
SimCity
Vehicular combat games
Video games scored by Jerry Martin
Windows games
Windows-only games
Video games developed in the United States